Jean Bouilhou born 7 December 1978 is a rugby union player for Toulouse in the Top 14 competition. He plays as a flanker. Whilst at Toulouse he won the Heineken Cup three times in 2003, 2005 and 2010, starting in the 2003 and 2010 finals and featuring as a replacement in 2005.

References

External links

Toulouse profile

1978 births
Living people
French rugby union players
Stade Toulousain players
Rugby union flankers
France international rugby union players
Sportspeople from Pau, Pyrénées-Atlantiques
Section Paloise players